Zorya Luhansk are a Ukrainian football club which are based in Luhansk. During the 2014–15 campaign the club competed in the Ukrainian Premier League, UEFA Europa League, Ukrainian Cup. They were under the management of Yuriy Vernydub.

Competitions

Premier League

League table

Matches

Ukrainian Cup

Uefa Europa League

References

External links 
 Official website
  zarya.lg.ua – Information site of fans of FC Zarya Lugansk
  Unofficial website
  "Zorya" (Dawn) of the football Luhansk-land

FC Zorya Luhansk seasons
Zorya Luhansk
Zorya Luhansk